The R660 road is a regional road in County Tipperary, Ireland, which runs south–north from the Cashel to Thurles. En route it passes through the village of Holycross, where it crosses the River Suir and passes the walls of Holy Cross Abbey.

See also
Roads in Ireland
National primary road
National secondary road

References
Roads Act 1993 (Classification of Regional Roads) Order 2006 – Department of Transport

Regional roads in the Republic of Ireland
Roads in County Tipperary